St Mary's Christian Brothers' Grammar School (St Mary's CBGS) is a Roman Catholic boys' grammar school in Belfast, Northern Ireland.

History

The origins of the school can be traced to St Mary's School which was established in Divis Street by the Irish Christian Brothers in 1866. The Brothers had been invited by Patrick Dorrian, Bishop of Down and Connor, to educate the working class children of the area. In 1929, a new secondary school was built in the nearby Barrack Street. The students were largely drawn from the surrounding district but also began to attract some from across Belfast and wider afield. Due to the growing student population, it was decided in the 1960s to build a new school. This opened in a site off the Glen Road in 1968.

The Barrack Street campus remained in use until 1998 when all students were accommodated in the greatly extended school on the Glen Road. The original building on Barrack Street is now known as the Westcourt Centre and provides a range of educational and community services. Edmund Ignatius Rice who founded the Irish Christian Brothers was born in Westcourt, Callan, County Kilkenny. In 2012, the Barrack Street building was listed as a 'building of special architectural or historic interest' by the Department of the Environment.

The school was originally entirely run by the Irish Christian Brothers but in the late twentieth century their numbers declined and the school is now entirely staffed by lay teachers.  It is now under the trusteeship of the Edmund Rice Schools Trust (NI).

List of Principals
 Br. Magee
 Br J.M. Murphy: c.1967-1970 
 Br. O’Neill (Stoneface): c.1973-1976 
 Br. D.M. McCrohan: c.1976-1986
 Br. Larry Ennis: c.1986-1990  
 Br. Leo Kelly: c.1990-1992
 Br. Denis Gleeson: c.1992-1996 
 Mr. Michael Crilly: 1996-97 (Acting) 
 Mr. Kevin Burke (An tUas. Caoimhín de Búrca): 1997-2008
 Mr. Jim Sheerin: 2008-2014 
 Mr. John Martin: 2014-2018
 Mrs. Siobhán Kelly: 2019–present

Facilities

The school is located on a large site on the lower slopes of the Black Mountain.  Besides various teaching classrooms it also has computer suites, a technology suite; art studios, music suite, science laboratories, as well as a large lecture theatre, an assembly hall and canteen. For sports, there are fifteen acres of playing field, including a 3G pitch, and an athletics track.  Indoors, there is a gymnasium and a swimming pool.

Academics

The school provides instruction in a broad range of academic subjects. At the advanced level students are prepared for exams in Applied Business, Business Communication Systems, Biology, Chemistry, Mathematics, Further Mathematics, Physics, ICT, Computing, Art & Design, Geography, History, Religious Studies, Politics,  English Literature, Drama, Irish, Music, Sports Studies, Media Studies, Home Economics, French, Spanish Travel and Leisure. St Mary's also offer a double award science option and a further maths option which pupils are chosen for.

in 2018, 81% of its entrants achieved five or more GCSEs at grades A* to C, including the core subjects English and Maths.

79% of its students who sat the A-level exams in 2021/22 were awarded three A*-C grades. In addition, there was a 100% per cent pass rate at grades A* to C or equivalent for students who entered BTEC Extended Certificate in IT, Art and Design, Biology, Chemistry, Finance, French, Further Mathematics, Physics, Technology and Sport.

In 2022, the school decided to abandon academic selection for entry.

In 2022, the school produced a special video that described its academic and other activities. It featured a song called Hang on to Tomorrow that was written by the poet Francis O’Hare and performed by Mrs Claire Wright, Head of Religious Studies.  Paul Lavery, Head of Drama, wrote and produced the video together with Mr David Guiney, music and drama teacher.

Sport

Gaelic Games
The school hurling team has the Mageean Cup a total of 28 times - the most in the competition. It won the title five times in succession in the 1990s and again three times since 2010. St. Marys also completed an Ulster Colleges double in 2008 winning both the Mageean Cup and the MacLarnon Cup for the first time in the school's history after beating St Columbs (Derry) 1–7 to 0–8 in the final at Healy Park in Omagh on St Patrick's Day.

The school has also had sustained success in handball and Gaelic football.

Soccer
Since the lifting of the ban on school representation in soccer competitions in 2002 the school has become the most successful in Belfast. On St Patrick's Day 2006 at Lisburn Distillery's grounds the Year 12s won its first ever soccer cup, the Belfast Cup, defeating Boys Model School. They followed up the next year with its first NI Cup in 2007 (Year 12) as well as the 2007 Belfast Cup (Year 11).

This success was followed up in 2008 as they won the year 9 Belfast Cup as well as an historic double in lifting both the Carnegie Schools Northern Ireland Cup (Year 13/14) and became the first school in 20 years to retain the Malcolm Brodie northern Ireland Trophy (year 12) with a victory over St Columbs, Derry. The winning tradition continues into the last year of the decade with wins in the NI Cup and Belfast Cup for the U14s and the U15s winning the Belfast cup.

Water polo
It is the only school in Ireland to have a clean sweep of All-Ireland titles at all age groups in consecutive years. A ninth Canada Cup in a row was won in April 2009 with several of the team continuing to represent Ireland at international tournaments.

Other sports
The school also competes in inter-schools competition in trampoline, athletics, golf, and basketball.

Clubs and Societies

Debating

The school runs debating societies in English, Irish and Spanish, and has sent delegates representing Ireland to both the European Youth Parliament and European Youth Commission.

The school has excelled in the European and Irish News inter-school quizzes, currently holding both trophies. The school debating team won the Northern Ireland Schools Debating Championship in 2008, defeating the team from Antrim Grammar School in the final at Stormont. This is the only time St Mary's has won the competition.

Arts
The school maintains an orchestra and a recording studio, stages theatrical and musical performances, as well as entering students in art competitions.

Community activities
The school also encourages students to participate in a range of community-oriented activities through the Eco Club, the Social Justice Advocacy Group and the St. Vincent de Paul Society. The school also initiated Project Zambia which is designed to involve students in providing support for marginalised communities in Zambia.

Notable alumni

See also: Past Pupils, St. Mary's CBGS, Edmund Rice Schools Trust

See also
 List of secondary schools in Belfast

References

External links
 St Mary's CBGS
 Project Zambia

Boys' schools in Northern Ireland
Congregation of Christian Brothers secondary schools in Northern Ireland
Educational institutions established in 1866
Grammar schools in Belfast
Catholic secondary schools in Northern Ireland
1866 establishments in Ireland